Sir Thomas Parr (c. 1483 – 11 November 1517) of Kendal in Westmorland (now Cumbria), England, was a courtier and is best known as the father of Queen Catherine Parr, the sixth and final wife of King Henry VIII.

Life

Thomas was the son of Sir William Parr and Elizabeth FitzHugh. He descended from King Edward III of England through his mother, Elizabeth. Thomas's paternal grandparents were Sir Thomas Parr of Kendal and Alice Tunstall. His maternal grandparents were Sir Henry FitzHugh, 5th Baron FitzHugh of Ravensworth Castle and Lady Alice Neville, daughter of Richard Neville, 5th Earl of Salisbury and Alice Montacute, 5th Countess of Salisbury. The Earl and Countess were parents to "Warwick, the Kingmaker" who was influential in the War of the Roses. The 5th Earl of Salisbury was the son of Lady Joan Beaufort, daughter of John of Gaunt, 1st Duke of Lancaster, son of Edward III.

Thomas' forebears, the Parrs of Kendal, were a down-to-earth northern landed gentry family. They had been, after the Crown, the most influential presence in southern Westmoreland since 1381. His mother and grandmother had been royal ladies-in-waiting, and this enabled Thomas to acquire a polished upbringing at the English court.

According to biographer Susan James, the young Thomas most likely studied under Maurice Westbury of Oxford, learning (among other things) classical Greek and Latin as well as modern languages. Westbury had been installed as a teacher by Lady Margaret Beaufort at her estate of Collyweston, Northamptonshire. 

It was at Collyweston that certain gentlemen, including the son of the Earl of Westmoreland, not only received an education but also acquired political connections that would prove useful in their future careers. Thomas' father, the first Baron Parr of Kendal, had once been Lady Margaret Beaufort's revisionary heir to her substantial lands in Westmoreland, known as the Richmond fee. Thomas's mother's family by her second marriage to Sir Nicholas Vaux (later 1st Baron Vaux of Harrowden) were also close to Margaret, enjoying a long-term relationship with her.

Sir Thomas More's first wife, Jane, was a niece of Parr by marriage, thereby making More a kinsman of his. Parr was fond of More – the future but ill-fated Lord Chancellor of the kingdom – and respected his intellect. He was also an advocate of the teachings of his erudite cousin, Sir Cuthbert Tunstall. These teachings embraced the discipline of mathematics, which Thomas' daughter Catherine put to good use in her later capacity as the lady of a succession of important households.

Under the rule of King Henry VIII, the Parr family flourished. Their influence, income, and titles increased as Thomas' career advanced. He became a Master of the Wards and was appointed Master of the Guards and Comptroller to the King. He was knighted and made High Sheriff of Northamptonshire in 1509, and of Lincolnshire in 1510. His wife, Maud, became a lady-in-waiting to Queen Catherine of Aragon. Shortly before the birth of their first surviving child, Catherine, the couple had bought a house in Blackfriars, London. Sir Thomas was popular with Henry and, as we have seen, served at court with Sir Thomas More. Although rich in land and money, Sir Thomas never attained the aristocratic title of baron. He did, however, hold messuages, lands, woods, and rents in Parr, Wigan, and Sutton, as well as the manor of Thurnham.

Marriage
Thomas Parr married Maud Green (6 April 1492 – 1 December 1531), daughter of Sir Thomas Green, in 1508. Before the birth of their most famous offspring, Catherine, Maud gave birth to a son. This occurred not long after Maud and Thomas' marriage. Their happiness at the birth proved short lived as the baby soon died and his name remains unknown. After the birth of their fourth child, Anne, Maud fell pregnant again – in circa 1517, the year of her husband's death. The child, however, either miscarried or was stillborn, or succumbed in very early infancy to an illness. Whatever the cause of the tragic loss, it may have been somewhat of a relief on a practical level as the baby had arrived at a difficult juncture in Maud's life, with her husband dying and she being appointed executrix of his estate.

The surviving children of Sir Thomas and Maud were:
 Catherine Parr (1512–5 September 1548), Queen Consort of England and Ireland, who wedded: 
Sir Edward Burgh, 1529 at Gainsborough, Lincolnshire, England.
John Nevill, 3rd Baron Latimer, 1534 in London, Middlesex, England.
King Henry VIII, 12 July 1543 at Hampton Court Palace in the private oratory of the Queen's Closet. 
Sir Thomas Seymour on 4 April 1547. Had issue: Mary Seymour. 
 William Parr, 1st Marquess of Northampton (c. 1513–28 October 1571). He married three times, all without issue: 
Anne Bourchier, 7th Baroness Bourchier 
Elizabeth Brooke 
Helena Snakenborg. 
 Anne Parr, Countess of Pembroke (c. 1515–20 February 1552), married in 1538, William Herbert, 1st Earl of Pembroke, by whom she had two sons and a daughter.

Death
Sir Thomas fell seriously ill in November 1517. He compiled a will which made provision for his wife and children. The two female children were to receive dowries while the bulk of the estate was to be inherited by his only male child, William. Because Sir Thomas died before any of his children were of age, Maud – together with Sir Cuthbert Tunstall, the children's uncle Sir William Parr, and a Dr. Melton – were made executors.

Sir Thomas died in his home at Blackfriars, London, on 11 November 1517. He was interred in St Anne's Church, Blackfriars, within an elaborate tomb. His widow was later buried beside him.

Ancestry

References

Parr
Parr
Parr
15th-century English people
16th-century English people
Thomas
English knights
High Sheriffs of Lincolnshire
High Sheriffs of Northamptonshire
Year of birth uncertain